St. Thomas of Villanova Catholic Secondary School is a publicly funded high school in LaSalle, Ontario, Canada. It is operated by the Windsor-Essex Catholic District School Board and serves as the primary Catholic secondary school in the LaSalle, Amherstburg, and River Canard areas of Essex County. It is located on the border between LaSalle and Amherstburg. The school's mascot is the Wildcat.

Villanova's Men's Baseball team has captured numerous titles at both the OFSAA-level and MHSAA-level. The school also offers other sports teams, including football, wrestling, soccer, volleyball, basketball, swimming, many of which compete at the provincial level. The Vocal, Drama, and Music programs collaboratively put on productions annually. Villanova also hosts a Dance program, and also offers many clubs, including Youth Troop, Campus Crew, Social Justice Club, Anime Club, Chess Club, and Best Buddies Club. 

Feeder elementary schools are Holy Cross Catholic Elementary School, Sacred Heart Catholic Elementary School, St. Anthony Catholic Elementary School, St. Joseph Catholic Elementary School, St. Mary Catholic Elementary School, and Stella Maris Catholic Elementary School.

Notable alumni
Michael DiPietro, NHL drafted goaltender

Luke Willson, NFL tight end with the Baltimore Ravens

Zack Kassian, NHL player with the Edmonton Oilers

See also
List of high schools in Ontario

References

External links
St. Thomas of Villanova Catholic Secondary School
Secondary School Profile at the Ministry of Education
Profile at the Windsor-Essex Catholic District School Board

Windsor-Essex Catholic District School Board
High schools in Essex County, Ontario
Educational institutions in Canada with year of establishment missing